Arsky (masculine), Arskaya (feminine), or Arskoye (neuter) may refer to:
Arsky District, a district of the Republic of Tatarstan, Russia
Arskoye, Kirov Oblast, a rural locality (a selo) in Kirov Oblast, Russia
Arskoye, Ulyanovsk Oblast, a rural locality (a selo) in Ulyanovsk Oblast, Russia
Arskaya, a defunct village which existed near the town of Beloretsk (now in the Republic of Bashkortostan, Russia)